Qaleh-ye Ghadir (also Romanized as Qal‘eh-ye Ghadīr and Qal‘eh-e Ghadīr; also known as Ghal‘ehé Ghadir) is a village in Jahad Rural District, Hamidiyeh District, Ahvaz County, Khuzestan Province, Iran. At the 2006 census, its population was 137, in 22 families.

References 

Populated places in Ahvaz County